James Price Wilemon Jr. (born September 10, 1940) is a former Democratic member of the Mississippi Senate, where he representing the 5th district. The 5th district is located in the northeastern portion of the state and includes all or portions of Tishomingo, Prentiss and Itawamba counties. He first won the seat at the 2003 general election after initially losing to his predecessor, Republican Charles Walden, in a special election in 2002 after the longtime holder of the seat, Democrat John White, resigned; he beat Walden in the rematch.

In the Senate, during the 2015-2019 session, he was the chair of the Municipalities Committee, Vice Chair of the Committees on Accountability, Efficiency & Transparency and Business and Financial Institutions respectively. He also serves on Appropriations, Drug Policy, Education, Enrolled Bills, Investigate State Offices, Judiciary-Division B and Universities & Colleges.

References

External links
Senator J.P. Wilemon Biography at Mississippi Senate
J.P. Wilemon at Open States

1940 births
Living people
Democratic Party members of the Mississippi House of Representatives
University of Memphis alumni
Democratic Party Mississippi state senators
21st-century American politicians
People from Prentiss County, Mississippi
People from Tishomingo County, Mississippi